Bruce Montgomery may refer to:

Bruce Montgomery (musical director) (1927–2008), composer, artist, conductor, and director from Philadelphia
Bruce Montgomery (composer), also known as Edmund Crispin, English crime writer and composer